The 1958 Air Force Falcons football team represented the United States Air Force Academy as an independent during the 1958 NCAA University Division football season. The Falcons did not have an official stadium until Falcon Stadium opened in 1962, but played most of their home games at DU Stadium at the University of Denver.

They were led by first-year head coach Ben Martin and played the fourth season for the Air Force Falcons football program. The Falcons finished undefeated with a record of 9–0–2. They made their first AP and coaches poll appearances, as well as their first bowl appearance in the Cotton Bowl Classic against TCU, which ended in a 

Air Force did not play Army or Navy this season; Army was first played in 1959 and Navy in 1960.

Schedule

Personnel

References

External links
 Sports Reference – 1958 Air Force football season

Air Force
Air Force Falcons football seasons
Air Force Falcons football